The Xinzhuang Baseball Stadium is a baseball stadium in Xinzhuang District, New Taipei City, Taiwan. It is currently mostly used for CPBL baseball games. The stadium can hold 12,500 people and was opened in 1997.

Ground rules
Part of the dugouts are covered by retractable roofs. The roofs must be retracted during games, and any fly ball that hits the retracted roof and bounces back is not considered a foul ball until it lands in foul territory.

Notable events
 18th National Congress of Kuomintang in October 2009
 2001 Asian Baseball Championship
 Hosted baseball events of the 2017 Summer Universiade

Transportation
The stadium is accessible within walking distance north west of Xinzhuang Station of Taipei Metro.

See also
 List of stadiums in Taiwan
 Sport in Taiwan

References

1997 establishments in Taiwan
Sports venues completed in 1997
Baseball venues in Taiwan
Sport in New Taipei
Buildings and structures in New Taipei
Tourist attractions in New Taipei
Multi-purpose stadiums in Taiwan